Memphis is the seventeenth studio album by American singer-songwriter Boz Scaggs. It was Scaggs's first solo release since 2008's Speak Low. The album was released on March 5, 2013, by 429 Records.  The album has debuted on Billboard 200 at No. 17, and has sold 90,000 copies in the US as of March 2015.

Critical reception

Thom Jurek of AllMusic gave the album a positive review with 4 of 5 stars, describing the record as "a stunner. Scaggs is in full possession of that iconic voice; he delivers songs with an endemic empathy and intimacy that make them sound like living, breathing stories."

Track listing
Most of the songs on the album were previously released by other singers. 

A two-disc version of the album was released for exclusive distribution by Barnes & Noble in the United States. The second disc contains six demos, three of which were recorded as fully produced versions for the final release of the album and three of which were not.

Personnel

 Boz Scaggs – lead and backing vocals, acoustic guitar (1-8, 10, 12), electric guitar (1-8, 10, 12), guitar (11)
 Ray Parker Jr. – acoustic guitar (1-8, 10, 12), electric guitar (1-8, 10, 12)
 Eddie Willis – guitar (9)
 Keb' Mo' – slide dobro (10)
 Rick Vito – guitar (11)
 Jim Cox – Rhodes (1, 5), acoustic piano (3, 5, 6, 7, 12), Wurlitzer electric piano (6), organ (12)
 Charles Hodges – organ (2, 5, 6, 9), Wurlitzer electric piano (4)
 Lester Snell – Wurlitzer electric piano (2, 9), string arrangements (2, 6), horn arrangements (6)
 Spooner Oldham – Wurlitzer electric piano (3, 5, 8, 10), acoustic piano (4), organ (4)
 Charlie Musselwhite – harmonica (10, 11)
 Willie Weeks – bass guitar (1-10, 12, upright bass (2, 4, 6)
 David Hungate – bass guitar (11)
 Steve Jordan – drums (1-10, 12), percussion (1-10, 12), horn arrangements (2), string arrangements (4), backing vocals
 Shannon Forrest – drums (11)
 Jack Ashford – vibraphone (5)
 Jim Horn – baritone saxophone (2, 6)
 Lannie McMillan – tenor saxophone (2, 6)
 Jack Hale – trombone (2, 6)
 Ben Cauley – trumpet (2, 6)
 Willie Mitchell – string arrangements (2)
 Jonathan Kirkscey – cello (2, 4, 6)
 Mark Wallace – cello (2, 4, 6)
 Beth Luscome – viola (2, 4, 6)
 Jennifer Puckett – viola (2, 4, 6)
 Barrie Cooper – violin (2, 4, 6)
 Jessie Munson – violin (2, 4, 6)
 Wen-Yih Yu – violin (2, 4, 6)
 Monét Owens – backing vocals, lead vocals (9)
 Claytoven Richardson – backing vocals

Production
 Steve Jordan – producer, engineer, mixing
 Niko Bolas – engineer, mixing
 Lawrence "Boo" Mitchell – additional recording
 Michael Rodriguez – additional recording
 Chris Taberez – additional recording, Pro Tools engineer
 Artie Smith – technician 
 Greg Calbi – mastering 
 Steve Fallone – additional mastering 
 David Alan Kogut – art direction
 Deborah Feingold – photography
 Matt McGinley – photography assistant
 Joel Hoffner – management 
 Ken Levitan – management
 Jack Rovner – management

 Studios 
 Recorded at Royal Recording Studios (Memphis, Tennessee) and The Barn (Napa Valley, California).
 Mastered at Sterling Sound (New York City, New York).

References

2013 albums
Boz Scaggs albums
429 Records albums